Monavvar Tappeh (also known as Fīrūzābād) is a village in Pirsalman Rural District, in the Central District of Asadabad County, Hamadan Province, Iran. At the 2006 census, its population was 418, in 95 families.

References 

Populated places in Asadabad County